Joe Slattery is a former ice hockey winger who played for Colorado College in the 1940s.

Career
Slattery made the Tigers' varsity squad just in time for their first full season since the end of World War II. His scoring punch helped the Tigers become one of the more dominant teams of the era, finishing with records of above 0.650 in each of his three seasons. Slattery's breakout year happened in 1947–48 when he led the team with 38 goals and was selected as one of the inaugural AHCA First Team All-Americans. He did not lead the team in scoring until the following year, however, when he posted 25 goals and 25 assists and was honored with his second All-American selection. Slattery's team records did not stand for long as nearly all of his scoring milestones were surpassed by Ron Hartwell.

Statistics

Regular season and playoffs

Awards and honors

References

External links
 

Canadian ice hockey left wingers
Ice hockey people from Saskatchewan
Colorado College Tigers men's ice hockey players
Sportspeople from Saskatoon
Date of birth unknown
Possibly living people
Year of birth missing
AHCA Division I men's ice hockey All-Americans